Mary Steichen Calderone (born Mary Rose Steichen; July 1, 1904 – October 24, 1998) was an American physician, author, public speaker, and public health advocate for reproductive rights and sex education. Known as the "mother of sex education" as well as the "grande dame of sex education", Dr. Calderone was an instrumental figure in the advancement of reproductive rights and sex education in the United States. Among her most notable feats include playing a key role in pushing forward a movement to reexamine and reform abortion laws in the U.S., helping to move birth control into the mainstream of American medicine, and transforming sex education from "a series of vague moral lessons focused on disease and reproduction" to a scientifically informed, comprehensive framework.

In 1953, Mary Calderone became the first female medical director of Planned Parenthood. During her tenure, the organization first began to advocate for abortion law reform. Led by Dr. Calderone, the organization convened a national conference of medical professionals on the issue in 1955. The conference, “Abortion in the United States", was the first instance of physicians and other professionals advocating reform of the laws which criminalized abortion, and it played an important role in creating a movement for the reform of abortion laws in the U.S.

In 1960, when the FDA approved the first oral contraceptive, Dr. Calderone began lobbying the American Medical Association (AMA) to endorse contraception as part of standard medical practice. After a four-year struggle, in 1964, she successfully overturned the AMA's policy against the dissemination of birth control information to patients, helping to move birth control into the mainstream of American medicine.

Shifting her focus toward sex education, Dr. Calderone left Planned Parenthood in 1964 to found and serve as Executive Director of SIECUS (Sex Information and Education Council of the United States). During her tenure at SIECUS, she lectured extensively across the United States, addressing high school and college students, parents, educators, religious leaders, and professional groups on sex education. Her popularity eventually made her a target for right-wing politicians, and ultra-conservative religious groups like the Christian Crusade, the John Birch Society, and the Moral Majority, who spent an estimated $40 million on a vicious smear campaign to discredit her. She retired from SIECUS in 1982, at the age of 78.

Throughout the latter half of her life, Dr. Calderone wrote many publications advocating open dialogue and access to information for all ages. Her extensive work with popularizing sex education has often been compared to Margaret Sanger's campaign for birth control.

Early life and family

Mary Calderone was born in New York, New York on July 1, 1904, as Mary Rose Steichen, the first child of Edward Steichen, a famous Luxembourgish-American photographer and artist, and his first wife, Clara Emma Smith, an American singer. Soon after her birth, the Steichen family moved to Paris, France, and then later to Voulangis, France, a small farming village approximately 32 km east of Paris. Her younger sister, Charlotte "Kate" Rodina Steichen, was born in Paris on May 27, 1908.

While in Voulangis, the family frequently received visits from Edward Steichen's artist friends and colleagues, including Constantin Brâncuși, Auguste Rodin, Isadora Duncan, Paul Cézanne, Henri Matisse, and Pablo Picasso. Biographer Jeffrey Moran suggests that Mary's bohemian childhood with her famous father, her uncle poet Carl Sandburg, and Quaker upbringing influenced her liberal outlook on sex as well as contributed to her opinionated and passionate nature. When Mary Calderone was six, for instance, she berated family friend and sculptor, Constantin Brâncuși, for his horizontal-headed bird pieces, which would undoubtedly hinder the bird from singing. Brâncuși complied and began sculpting birds with more upturned heads.

A the start of the First World War, in 1914, the family fled to New York. Calderone's parents separated soon after and sent Mary to live in New York City at the home of their friends, Dr. Leopold and Elizabeth Stieglitz, brother and sister-in-law of Steichen's friend and photography colleague, Alfred Stieglitz. Calderone’s interest in medicine began while accompanying Dr. Stieglitz on his hospital rounds.

While in New York, Calderone attended the Brearley School for her secondary education. She matriculated at Vassar College, graduating in 1925 with an B.A. in Chemistry. Calderone decided to go into theatre and studied for three years at the American Laboratory Theatre. She was the model for the figures on the Pratt Institute flagpole, whose bronze was sculpted by her uncle Willard Dryden Paddock, and was erected in 1926 to commemorate the soldiers who served in World War I.

In 1926, Calderone married actor W. Lon Martin and had two daughters, Nell (1926) and Linda (1928). With her marriage declining, she abandoned acting and divorced in 1933. In 1935, her eight-year-old daughter Nell died of pneumonia. This, along with dashed acting dreams and a divorce, plunged Calderone into depression. After an in-depth series of aptitude tests at the Johnson O'Connor Research Foundation in New York, at age 30, she decided to return to education and study medicine.

She obtained her M.D. degree from the University of Rochester medical school in 1939, and later, her M.P.H. from Columbia University in 1942. For her field study at Columbia, Calderone worked as a health officer-in-training at Lower East Side District Health Center in New York City, where she met Dr. Frank A. Calderone, whom she married in 1941. Frank Calderone was then the head of the Lower East Side District Health Center, and after serving as the first deputy health commissioner of New York City from 1943 to 1946, became a leading figure in the World Health Organization (WHO) during its formative years. The Calderone Prize, the most prestigious prize in the field of public health, is named after him. The couple had two daughters, Francesca (1943) and Maria (1946).

Career

Planned Parenthood
Dr. Calderone worked as a physician in the Great Neck, New York public school system from 1949 to 1953. As a female public health professional and physician - a rarity at the time - she became well-known in public health circles, as she regularly attended the American Public Health Association's annual conferences. In 1953, William Vogt, National Director of the controversial Planned Parenthood Federation of America, offered Dr. Calderone the position of Medical Director. Despite being advised by her public health colleagues that taking the job would be "professional suicide", Calderone accepted the position, hoping that her role would help "[legitimize] family planning in the worlds of medicine and public health."

Dr. Calderone's 11-year tenure at Planned Parenthood was prolific. In 1955, she organized "Abortion in the United States", a national conference of medical professionals that instigated the movement to legalize abortion. This was the first instance of physicians and other professionals advocating reform of the laws which criminalized abortion, and it played a key role in creating a movement for the reform of abortion laws in the U.S. The conference, which had no advanced publicity at the time, resulted in a book, Abortion in the United States, which was published in 1958 to critical acclaim and remained a classic in its field for years. According to historian Ellen S. More, “[i]n many ways the book was a milestone. Not only did it reveal a deep commitment among respected medical practitioners and scholars to treat abortion and contraception as subjects of legitimate research, but... because the book included a summary of the laws in every state pertaining to abortion, it became a reference for legal scholars and policy activists, not only physicians.”

Prior to Dr. Calderone, Planned Parenthood, and its founder Margaret Sanger, avoided the controversial subject of abortion, arguing that it would not be needed if every woman had access to birth control. Today, Planned Parenthood is the largest single provider of reproductive health services and the largest single provider of abortion, in the United States.

Dr. Calderone was also instrumental in moving birth control into the mainstream of American medicine. As an effective liaison between Planned Parenthood and the public health establishment, she worked behind the scenes to lobby professional medical groups such as the American Public Health Association (APHA) and the American Medical Association (AMA), to support contraception as part of standard medical practice. In 1959, she successfully won the endorsement of the APHA, which became the first large professional organization to issue a public statement endorsing family planning as part of ordinary medical care, declaring that “full freedom should be extended to all population groups for the selection and use of such methods for the regulation of family size as are consistent with the creed and mores of the individuals concerned." However, her biggest success came in 1964, when she successfully convinced the more conservative AMA to overturn its longstanding policy against the dissemination of birth control information to patients, and endorse contraception as part of standard medical practice.

During her tenure at Planned Parenthood, Dr. Calderone also wrote numerous articles for popular and professional periodicals, as well as books such as Release from Sexual Tensions (1960) and Manual of Contraceptive Practice (1964), a pioneering medical text.

SIECUS
As letters arrived at Dr. Calderone's office in Planned Parenthood daily asking questions about not just the physical act of sex, but sexuality at large, Calderone came to the realization that sexuality did not just equate to genitality, and that sex education was sorely lacking in American society. Believing that her work should be limited to preventive measures against pregnancy, and with the conviction that simply "handing out contraceptives was not enough," Dr. Calderone quit her position at Planned Parenthood in 1964 and established SIECUS (the Sex Information and Education Council of the United States), the first and only single-issue, national advocacy group dedicated to promoting sex education. Driven by Dr. Calderone's dynamic talks across the nation and its mission statement, "to establish man's sexuality as a health entity," the organization became an essential umbrella group for school administrators, sex educators, physicians, social activists, and parents seeking to access information about teaching sexuality education. Dr. Calderone soon became a household name and "a magnet for publicity [as] articles in Seventeen, Look, McCall’s, Life Magazine, Parade, Playboy, and other popular magazines profiled her life and analyzed her arguments, [while] her appearances on TV shows such as the Dick Cavett Show and Sixty Minutes reached millions of viewers.”

Attacks

Dr. Calderone and her organization became recognized and respected with the message of sex as a positive force, but opponents also watched her closely. Her insistence that sex education should begin as early as kindergarten, with age-appropriate lessons on topics such as basic anatomy and consent, drew the ire of right-wing politicians and religious conservative groups like Mothers Organized for Moral Stability (MOMS) and the John Birch Society, who spent an estimated $40 million on a vicious smear campaign to discredit her.

In 1968, the Christian Crusade's Billy James Hargis and Gordon V. Drake targeted SIECUS, and in particular, Dr. Calderone, in the infamous Is the School House the Proper Place to Teach Raw Sex? pamphlet, as well as other similar fearmongering publications, claiming that the organization sought to undermine Christian morality, promote promiscuity, and corrupt children. The pamphlet, which included deliberate misquotations and fabrications of events, also argued that sex education is part of a "giant Communist conspiracy." Soon after, SIECUS and Dr. Calderone became targets of a nationwide smear campaign, with Calderone’s speaking appearances drawing picket lines and protests from ultra-conservative groups who followed her across the country.

By the mid-1970s, Dr. Calderone's influence had been weakened by these attacks, and SIECUS's funding and resources began to dwindle. In 1978, she stepped down as Executive Director of SIECUS, although she remained as President. Nevertheless, Dr. Calderone's crusade for sex education with a "positive approach and moral neutrality" continued, as did her expansion of sex education as a means to talk about topics other than the physical act of sex, such as puberty, consent, and sexism.

Despite her opponents' characterization of her as an "aging sexual libertine", as a grandmother and practicing Quaker, Calderone's personal convictions did not align with the burgeoning sexual revolution of the late 1960s. While she was adamant about sexual freedom, Calderone personally believed that sex should be ultimately reserved for marriage and that sexuality finds its peak expression through a permanent monogamous bond.

After years of vitriolic attacks and death threats from extremist groups, Dr. Calderone retired from SIECUS in 1982, at the age of 78.

Later career
From 1982 to 1988, Dr. Calderone was an adjunct professor in human sexuality at New York University. She published several books on sex education, including The Family Book About Sexuality (1981; with Eric W. Johnson) and Talking with Your Child About Sex: Questions and Answers for Children from Birth to Puberty (1982; with James W. Ramey). She continued to be a frequent and popular lecturer and was the recipient of numerous professional and humanitarian awards.

Death
Dr. Calderone was a resident of Kendal at Longwood, a Quaker continuing care retirement community in Kennett Square, Pennsylvania. She died in the skilled nursing facility there on October 24, 1998. She was 94.

Awards and honors
Dr. Calderone has received numerous awards and honors both posthumously and over the course of her life.

 Browning Award for Prevention of Diseases, American Public Health Association
 Elizabeth Blackwell Award for Distinguished Services to Humanity, Hobart and William Smith Colleges
 Lifetime Achievement Award from the Schlesinger Library of Radcliffe/Harvard College
 The Award for Human Service from the Mental Health Association of New York
 Humanist of the Year from the American Humanist Association (1974)
 Margaret Sanger Award from Planned Parenthood Federation of America (1980)
 National Women’s Hall of Fame inductee (1998)

Honorary degrees

 D.Med. Science (honorary), Women's Medical College (now Drexel University College of Medicine), 1967.
 Doctor of Humane Letters (honorary), Newark State College (now Kean University), 1971.
 Doctor of Humane Letters (honorary), Dickinson College, 1981.
 Doctor of Humane Letters (honorary), Jersey City State College (now New Jersey City University), 1982.
 Doctor of Science (honorary), Adelphi University, 1971.
 Doctor of Science (honorary), Worcester Foundation Experimental Biology (now University of Massachusetts Medical School), 1974.
 Doctor of Science (honorary), Brandeis University, 1975.
 Doctor of Science (honorary), Haverford College, 1978.
 Doctor of Science (honorary), Columbia University, 1985.
 Doctor of Laws (honorary), Kenyon College, 1972.
 Ped.D. (honorary), Hofstra University, 1978.
 Doctor of Humanities (honorary), Bucknell University, 1982.

Selected works and publications

See also

References

External links
Papers, 1904–1971. Schlesinger Library, Radcliffe Institute, Harvard University.

1904 births
1998 deaths
American feminists
American humanists
American people of Luxembourgian descent
American abortion-rights activists
American Quakers
Sex education advocates
Vassar College alumni
University of Rochester alumni
Columbia University Mailman School of Public Health alumni
American public health doctors
20th-century American women physicians
20th-century American physicians
Brearley School alumni
Quaker feminists
20th-century Quakers
Women public health doctors